Alexander White "Sandy" Baldwin (June 1835 – November 14, 1869), frequently known as A. W. Baldwin, was a United States district judge of the United States District Court for the District of Nevada.

Education and career

Born in June 1835, in Gainesville, Alabama, Baldwin read law. He entered private practice in Virginia City, Utah Territory from 1858 to 1859. He was prosecutor of Storey County, Utah Territory (Nevada Territory from March 2, 1861) starting in 1859. He resumed private practice in Virginia City, Nevada Territory (State of Nevada from October 31, 1864) until 1865.

Federal judicial service

Baldwin was nominated by President Abraham Lincoln on March 10, 1865, to the United States District Court for the District of Nevada, to a new seat authorized by 13 Stat. 440. He was confirmed by the United States Senate on March 11, 1865, and received his commission the same day. His service terminated on November 14, 1869, due to his death in Alameda, California, as a result of a railroad accident.

Personal life

Baldwin's father, Joseph G. Baldwin, was also an attorney who served as an Associate Justice of the California Supreme Court.

Baldwin died as the result of a railway accident at San Leandro, California (near Alameda) on November 14, 1869 at the age of 33.

References

Sources
 

1835 births
1869 deaths
Judges of the United States District Court for the District of Nevada
United States federal judges appointed by Abraham Lincoln
19th-century American judges
19th-century American politicians
United States federal judges admitted to the practice of law by reading law
Railway accident deaths in the United States